Plenaster is a monotypic genus of sponges in the family Stelligeridae. Plenaster craigi is the sole species. It lives on rocks on the Pacific Ocean seafloor.

Plenaster craigi have been named after their star like organs inside their bodies.

References

Heteroscleromorpha